Pyrenopeziza brassicae is a plant pathogen infecting Brassicaceae (formerly known as Cruciferae).

References

External links 
 Index Fungorum
 USDA ARS Fungal Database

Fungal plant pathogens and diseases
Dermateaceae
Fungi described in 1850